Bagrat V may refer to:

 Bagrat V of Georgia, King in 1360–1393
 Bagrat V of Imereti, King for four times in 1660–81